Hinkletown is a populated place situated in Plumstead Township in Bucks County, Pennsylvania, United States.

The community was named for Philip Hinkle, an early settler who opened a tavern there in 1794.

References

Populated places in Bucks County, Pennsylvania